Frau is a surname. Notable people with the surname include:

 Alessandro Frau (born 1977), Italian footballer
 Maria Frau (born 1930), Italian actress
 Pierre-Alain Frau (born 1980), French footballer